The DuBard School for Language Disorders at the University of Southern Mississippi was founded in 1962.  DuBard is a clinical division of the University of Southern Mississippi's College of Nursing and Health Professions in the School of Speech and Hearing Sciences.  The mission of the DuBard School for Language Disorders at The University of Southern Mississippi is to bring the gift of oral and written language to individuals with communication disorders and reading disabilities, including dyslexia, through use of the DuBard Association Method® in direct clinical services, professional training, and research.

References

External links

University of Southern Mississippi